, real name  or , was a Japanese writer from the Meiji Period. She was Japan's first professional female writer of modern literature, specialising in short stories and poetry, and also an extensive diarist.

Biography

Early life
Natsuko Higuchi was born in Tokyo on 2 May 1872 as the fourth child and second daughter of Noriyoshi Higuchi and Ayame "Taki" Furuya. Her parents were from a peasant community in nearby Yamanashi Prefecture, but her father had managed to procure samurai status in 1867. Despite only enjoying the position for a short time before the samurai caste was abolished with the Meiji Restoration, growing up in a samurai household was a formative experience for her.

In 1886, she began studying waka poetry at the Haginoya, a private school run by Utako Nakajima. Here she received weekly poetry lessons and lectures on Japanese literature. There were also monthly poetry competitions in which all students, past and present, were invited to participate. Poetry taught at this school was that of the conservative court poets of the Heian period. She felt inferior and unprepossessing among the other students, the great majority of whom came from the upper-class.

Her compulsion to write became evident by 1891 when she began to keep a diary in earnest. It would become hundreds of pages long, covering the five years left in her life. With her feelings of social inferiority, her timidity, and the increasing poverty of her family, her diary was the place where she could assert herself. Her journals were also a place for her to assert objectivity and included her views on literary art as well as others' views on her work.

Efforts to become a writer
In 1889, two years after her oldest brother's death, her father died. Following a failed business investment by her father, finances were very tight. Also, her fiancé, jurist and future governour Saburō Shibuya, soon broke off their engagement. At the proposal of her teacher, she moved into the Haginoya as an apprentice, but after a few months, unhappy with what she saw as an inordinate amount of household duties, she moved out again. Together with her mother and younger sister Kuniko, she moved to Hongō district, where the women earned their income by sewing and laundry work. Seeing the success of a classmate, Kaho Miyake, who had written a novel, Yabu no uguisu (lit. "Bush warbler in the grove", 1888), and received abundant royalties, Higuchi decided to become a novelist to support her family.

Her initial efforts at writing fiction were in the form of a short story. In 1891 she met her future advisor who would help, she assumed, connect her with editors: Tosui Nakarai. She fell in love with him, not knowing that, at 31, he had a reputation as a womanizer. Nor did she realize that he wrote popular literature which aimed to please the general public and in no way wished to be associated with serious literature. Her mentor did not return her love for him, and instead treated her as a younger sister. This failed relationship would become a recurrent theme in Higuchi's fiction.

In March 1892, she gave her literary debut with the story Yamizakura (Flowers at Dusk), published in the first issue of the magazine Musashino, under her pen name Ichiyō Higuchi. The stories from this first period (1892–1894) suffered from the excessive influence of Heian poetry. Higuchi felt compelled to demonstrate her classical literary training. The plots were thin, there was little development of character, and they were loaded down by excessive sentiment, especially when compared to what she was writing concurrently in her diary. But she was developing rapidly. Several of her trademark themes appear; for example, the triangular relationship among a lonely, beautiful, young woman who has lost her parents, a handsome man who has abandoned her (and remains in the background), and a lonely and desperate ragamuffin who falls in love with her. Another theme Higuchi repeated was the ambition and cruelty of the Meiji middle class.

The story Umoregi (lit. "In Obscurity") signaled Higuchi's arrival as a professional writer. It was published in the prestigious journal Miyako no hana in November and December 1892, only nine months after she had started writing in earnest. Her work was noticed and she was recognized as a promising new author.

Last years

In 1893, Higuchi, her mother and her sister abandoned their middle-class house and moved to a poor neighborhood where they opened a stationery store that before long failed. Their new dwelling was a five-minute walk from Tokyo's red-light district Yoshiwara. Her experience living in this neighborhood would provide material for several of her later stories, especially Takekurabe, (lit. "Comparing heights"; Child's Play in the Robert Lyons Danly translation, Growing Up in the Edward Seidensticker translation).

The stories of her mature period (1894–1896) were not only marked by her experience living near the red-light district and greater concern over the plight of women, but also by the influence of Ihara Saikaku, a 17th-century writer, whose stories she had recently discovered. His distinctiveness lay in great part in his acceptance of low-life characters as worthwhile literary subjects. What Higuchi added was a special awareness of suffering and sensitivity. To this period belong Ōtsugomori (On the Last Day of the Year), Nigorie (Troubled Waters), Jūsan'ya (The Thirteenth Night), Takekurabe and Wakaremichi (Separate Ways).

With these last stories, her fame spread throughout the Tokyo literary establishment. She was commended for her traditional style, and was called "the last woman of the old Meiji" in reflection of her evocation of the past. In her modest home, she was visited by other writers, students of poetry, admirers, the curious, critics, and editors requesting her collaboration. Due to constant interruptions and frequent headaches, Higuchi stopped writing. As her father and her oldest brother had before her, she contracted tuberculosis. She died on 23 November 1896 at the age of 24. She was buried in Tsukiji Hongan-ji Wadabori Cemetery in Suginami, Tokyo.

Selected works
At the time of her death, Higuchi left behind 21 short stories, nearly 4,000 poems (which are regarded being of lesser quality than her prose), numerous essays and a multivolume diary. The year refers to the date of first publication.

Short stories
1892: Yamizakura (Flowers at Dusk)
1892: Wakarejimo
1892: Tamadasuki
1892: Samidare
1892: Kyōzukue
1892: Umoregi
1893: Akatsukizukuyo
1893: Yuki no hi (A Snowy Day)
1893: Koto no ne (The Sound of the Koto)
1894: Hanagomori
1894: Yamiyo (Encounters on a Dark Night)
1894: Ōtsugomori (On the Last Day of the Year or The Last Day of the Year)
1895: Takekurabe (Child's Play, Growing Up, They Compare Heights or Teenagers Vying for Tops)
1895: Noki moru tsuki
1895: Yuku kumo
1895: Utsusemi
1895: Nigorie (Troubled Waters, Muddy Water or In the Gutter)
1895: Jūsan'ya (The Thirteenth Night)
1896: Kono ko
1896: Wakaremichi (Separate Ways or The Parting of the Ways)
1896: Ware kara

Translations
Higuchi's stories have been translated into a variety of languages. The first English translation dates back as early as 1903 (Ōtsugomori, as The Last Day of the Year, by Tei Fujio). In 1981, a selection of nine of her stories appeared with new translations provided by Robert Lyons Danly.

Some stories have also been translated from classical Japanese language, in which all of Higuchi's works are written, into modern Japanese, like Hiromi Itō's translation of Nigorie or Fumiko Enchi's translation of Takekurabe.

Legacy
Higuchi's portrait adorns the Japanese 5000 yen banknote as of fall 2004, becoming the third woman to appear on a Japanese banknote, after Empress Jingū in 1881 and Murasaki Shikibu in 2000. 

Her stories Ōtsugomori, Nigorie, Jūsan'ya and Takekurabe have been repeatedly adapted for film and television, notably An Inlet of Muddy Water (1953, dir. Tadashi Imai) and Takekurabe (1955, dir. Heinosuke Gosho).

A film based on Higuchi's life, Higuchi Ichiyō, was released in 1939, starring Isuzu Yamada and directed by Kyotaro Namiki. Higuchi was also the protagonist of a theatre play by Hisashi Inoue, Zutsuu katakori Higuchi Ichiyō, which was first performed in 1984.

References

Bibliography

Further reading

External links

 
 
 "Ōtsugomori: The Last Day of the Year" (story) [pdf online]

1872 births
1896 deaths
People from Tokyo
19th-century deaths from tuberculosis
19th-century Japanese novelists
Tuberculosis deaths in Japan
People of Meiji-period Japan
Japanese women short story writers
19th-century Japanese women writers
19th-century Japanese writers
Japanese diarists
19th-century diarists
Women diarists